Cyphotrechodes gibbipennis is a species of beetle in the family Carabidae, the only species in the genus Cyphotrechodes.

References

Trechinae